The following outline is provided as an overview of and topical guide to Sydney:

Sydney –

General reference 
 Pronunciation: 
 Common English name(s): Sydney
 Official English name(s): Sydney
 Adjectival(s): Sydneysider
 Demonym(s): Sydneysider

Geography of Sydney 
Geography of Sydney
 Sydney is:
 a city
 a state capital 
 capital of New South Wales
 Population of Sydney: 5,029,768
 Area of Sydney: 12,367.7 km2 (4,775.2 sq mi)
 Atlas of Sydney

Location of Sydney 
 Sydney is situated within the following regions:
 Southern Hemisphere and Eastern Hemisphere
 Oceania
 Australasia
 Australia (continent) 
 Australia (outline)
 New South Wales
 Time zone(s): 
 Australian Eastern Standard Time (UTC+10)
 In Summer (DST): Australian Eastern Daylight Time (UTC+11)

Environment of Sydney 

 Climate of Sydney

Natural geographic features of Sydney 
 Bays in Sydney
 Botany Bay
 Cockle Bay
 Farm Cove
 Sydney Cove
 Beaches in Sydney
 Bondi Beach
 Bronte Beach
 Lady Robinson Beach
 Manly Beach
 Northern Beaches
 Dunes in Sydney
 Cronulla sand dunes
 Harbours in Sydney
 Circular Quay
 Darling Harbour
 Port Jackson
Middle Harbour
 Headlands and cliffs in Sydney
 Bradleys Head
 The Gap
 Sydney Heads
 Islands in Sydney
 Bare Island
 Clark Island
 Cockatoo Island
 Goat Island
 Rodd Island
 Scotland Island
 Shark Island
 Snapper Island
 Spectacle Island
 Lakes in Sydney
 Chipping Norton Lake
 Lake Parramatta
 Mountains in Sydney
 Blue Mountains
Blue Mountains National Park
 Rivers in Sydney
 Cooks River
 Georges River
 Hawkesbury River
 Nepean River
 Parramatta River
 Geology
 Sydney Basin
 Sydney sandstone
 Narrabeen group

Areas of Sydney 

City of Sydney

Regions of Sydney

Suburbs of Sydney

Districts of Sydney 
 Sydney central business district
 North Sydney

Neighborhoods (localities) in Sydney 

Barangaroo
 Blues Point
 Central
 Chinatown
 Circular Quay
 Darling Harbour
 Kings Cross
 Thai Town
 The Rocks

Locations in Sydney 
 Tourist attractions in Sydney
 Museums in Sydney
 Shopping areas and markets

Bridges in Sydney 

Bridges in Sydney
 Anzac Bridge
 Boothtown Aqueduct
 Gladesville Bridge
 Pyrmont Bridge
 Spit Bridge
 Sydney Harbour Bridge

Cultural and exhibition centres in Sydney 

 International Convention Centre Sydney
 The Concourse

Forts of Sydney 
 Fort Denison
 Fort Denison Light
 Fort Philip

Fountains in Sydney 

 Archibald Fountain
 El Alamein Fountain

Monuments and memorials in Sydney 
 Anzac Memorial
 Kokoda Track Memorial Walkway
 Sydney Cenotaph

Museums and art galleries in Sydney 

Museums in Sydney
 Art Gallery of New South Wales
 Australian Museum
 James Cook Collection
 Australian National Maritime Museum
 Justice and Police Museum
 Madame Tussauds Sydney
 Manly Art Gallery and Museum
 Museum of Contemporary Art Australia 
 Museum of Sydney
 Nicholson Museum
 Powerhouse Museum
 Sydney Tramway Museum

Parks and gardens in Sydney 

Parks in Sydney
 Auburn Botanical Gardens
 Belmore Park
 Bicentennial Park
 Brenan Park
 Centennial Parklands
 Central Gardens Nature Reserve
 Chinese Garden of Friendship
 Hyde Park
 Luna Park Sydney
 Macquarie Place Park
 Moore Park
 Observatory Park
 Royal Botanic Garden
 Sydney Park
 Taronga Zoo
 The Domain
 Tumbalong Park
 Wild Life Sydney
 Wynyard Park

Public squares in Sydney 
 Queen's Square
 Railway Square
 Whitlam Square

Religious buildings in Sydney 

 Christ Church St Laurence
 Hunter Baillie Memorial Presbyterian Church
 St Andrew's Cathedral
 St James' Church
 St. Maron's Cathedral
 St Mary's Cathedral
 St Philip's Church

Secular buildings in Sydney 

 1 Bligh Street
 25 Martin Place
 Admiralty House
 Australia Square
 AWA Tower
 Bellevue
 Bennelong Apartments
 Boronia House
 Carthona, Darling Point
 Cloncorrick
 Customs House
 Deutsche Bank Place
 General Post Office
 Government House
 Grace Building
 Hordern Pavilion
 Horizon Apartments
 Hyde Park Barracks
 International Towers Sydney
 Lindesay, Darling Point
 Parliament House
 Quay Quarter Tower
 Queen Victoria Building
 The Star
 Sydney Mint
 Sydney Observatory
 Sydney Town Hall
 Treasury Building
 Victoria Barracks
 Vaucluse House
 Zenith Centre

Streets in Sydney 

 Broadway
 Cumberland Highway
 George Street
 Elizabeth Street
 Great Western Highway
 Hume Highway
 Liverpool Street
 Macquarie Street
 Oxford Street
 Parramatta Road
 Pitt Street
 Sydney Orbital Network
 Victoria Road

Theatres in Sydney 

 Capitol Theatre
 Enmore Theatre
 Roslyn Packer Theatre
 State Theatre
 Sydney Opera House
 Theatre Royal
 Wharf Theatre

Towers in Sydney 
 Sydney Tower

Demographics of Sydney 
Demographics of Sydney

Government and politics of Sydney 
Government and politics of Sydney
 Division of Sydney
 Mayors, lord mayors and administrators of Sydney
 International relations of Sydney
  San Francisco, California, United States (1968)

Law and order in Sydney 
 Crime in Sydney
 Sydney lockout laws

History of Sydney
History of Sydney

History of Sydney, by period or event 
Timeline of Sydney
 Early history
 Sydney during the 18th and the 19th century 
 The crew of HMS Endeavour under the command of James Cook sights the east coast of Australia (1770)
 The British colony of New South Wales is subsequently established with the arrival of the First Fleet under the command of Captain Arthur Phillip (1788)
 The colony is named "Sydney", after the British Home Secretary, Thomas Townshend, 1st Viscount Sydney (1788)
 Hawkesbury and Nepean Wars (1790–1816)
 List of Governors of New South Wales
 Sydney during the 20th century
 Sydney becomes the capital of the Australian state of New South Wales (1901)
 Sydney during the World War II (1939–1945) 
 Post-war Sydney
 Sydney in the new millennium

Culture of Sydney 

Culture of Sydney

Arts in Sydney

Architecture of Sydney 
Architecture of Sydney
 Art Deco buildings in Sydney
 Heritage houses in Sydney
 Tallest buildings in Sydney

Cinema of Sydney 
Cinema of Sydney
 Fox Studios Australia
 Sydney Film Festival

Literature of Sydney 
Literature of Sydney
 Sydney Writers' Festival

Music and ballet of Sydney 

Music of Sydney
 Ballet of Sydney
 Sydney Dance Company
 Music festivals and competitions in Sydney
 Sydney International Piano Competition
 Music schools in Sydney
 Sydney Conservatorium of Music 
 Music venues in Sydney
 City Recital Hall
 Sydney Lyric
 Sydney Opera House
 Musical ensembles in Sydney
 Australian Brandenburg Orchestra
 Australian Chamber Orchestra
 Harbour City Opera
 Opera Australia
Opera Australia Orchestra
 St Mary's Cathedral Choir
 Sydney Chamber Choir
 Sydney Chamber Opera
 Sydney Philharmonia Choirs
 Sydney Symphony Orchestra
 Sydney University Symphony Orchestra
 Musicians from Sydney
 Jonathan Mills
 Songs about Sydney

Theatre of Sydney 
 Bell Shakespeare
 Sydney Theatre Company

Visual arts of Sydney 

 Sydney rock engravings
Public art in the City of Sydney
 Cloud Arch
 Forgotten Songs
 Halo

Events in Sydney

 Australian Fashion Week
 Australian International Motor Show
 Sculpture by the Sea
 Sydney New Year's Eve
 Sydney Royal Easter Show
 Sydney to Hobart Yacht Race

Festivals in Sydney

 Biennale of Sydney
 Big Day Out
 Sydney Festival
 The Great Escape
 Vivid Sydney

Languages of Sydney

Languages of Sydney
 Australian English
 Dharug language

Media in Sydney
 Newspapers in Sydney
The Daily Telegraph
Sydney Morning Herald
 Radio and television in Sydney
 Australian Broadcasting Corporation

People from Sydney
 Michael Mobbs

Religion in Sydney 

Religion in Sydney
 Catholicism in Sydney 
Roman Catholic Archdiocese of Sydney
Catholic Bishops and Archbishops of Sydney
St Mary's Cathedral

Sports in Sydney 
Sport in Sydney
 Basketball in Sydney
 Sydney Kings
 Cricket in Sydney
 New South Wales cricket team

 Football in Sydney
 Association football in Sydney
 Sydney Derby (A-League)
Sydney FC
Western Sydney Wanderers FC
 Australian rules football in Sydney
 Sydney Derby (AFL)
 Greater Western Sydney Giants
 Sydney Swans
 Rugby football in Sydney
New South Wales Waratahs
Shute Shield
 Olympics in Sydney
 2000 Summer Olympics
 Venues of the 2000 Summer Olympics
 Sports competitions in Sydney
 Sydney International
 Sydney Marathon
 Sports venues in Sydney
 Randwick Racecourse
 Rosehill Racecourse
 Royal Sydney Golf Club
 Sydney Cricket Ground
 Sydney Football Stadium 
 Sydney Olympic Park
NSW Tennis Centre
Stadium Australia
State Sports Centre
Sydney International Aquatic Centre
Sydney Olympic Park Athletic Centre
Sydney Olympic Park Hockey Centre
Sydney Showground Stadium
Sydney Super Dome

Economy and infrastructure of Sydney 

Economy of Sydney
 Communications in Sydney
 Financial services in Sydney
 Australian Securities Exchange
 Reserve Bank of Australia
 Hotels in Sydney
 Cremorne Point Manor
 Crown Sydney
 The Star
 Restaurants and cafés in Sydney
 Quay
 Tetsuya's
 Shopping malls and markets in Sydney
 Broadway Shopping Centre
 Chatswood Chase
 Harbourside Shopping Centre
 Paddy's Markets
 Pitt Street Mall
 Stockland Wetherill Park
 The Galeries
 The Strand Arcade
 Tourism in Sydney
 BridgeClimb Sydney
 Whale watching in Sydney
 The Entertainment Quarter

Transportation in Sydney 

Public transport in Sydney
 Air transport in Sydney
 Airports in Sydney
 Rose Bay Water Airport
 Sydney Airport
 Western Sydney Airport
 Maritime transport in Sydney 
 Sydney Ferries
Manly ferry services
 Road transport in Sydney
 Buses in Sydney
NightRide
 Cycling in Sydney 
Bike paths in Sydney
Sydney Harbour Bridge cycleway

Rail transport in Sydney 
Rail transport in Sydney
 City Circle
 Light rail in Sydney

 Railways in Sydney
 Proposed railways in Sydney
 Railway stations in Sydney
Central railway station
 Sydney Metro
 Sydney Metro Northwest
 Sydney Metro City & Southwest
 Sydney Trains
 List of Sydney Trains railway stations
 Sydney Trains rolling stock

Education in Sydney 

Education in Sydney
 Universities in Sydney
 University of New South Wales
 University of Sydney
 University of Technology Sydney
 Macquarie University
 Research institutes in Sydney
 Charles Perkins Centre
 Westmead Institute for Medical Research

Healthcare in Sydney 

Healthcare in Sydney
 Hospitals in Sydney
 Blacktown Hospital
 Nepean Hospital
 Northern Beaches Hospital
 Prince of Wales Hospital
 Royal North Shore Hospital
 St Vincent's Hospital
 Sydney Hospital

See also 

 Outline of geography

References

External links 

Sydney
Sydney